Cash coins were introduced to Japan in the century inspired by the Chinese Kaigen Tsūhō (開元通寳) cash coins from the Tang dynasty. Chinese cash coins also circulated in other countries and inspired similar currencies such as the Korean mun, Ryukyuan mon, Vietnamese văn, while they also circulated as far south as Indonesia. Because these currencies were so similar cash coins around the Far East were interchangeable and Japanese cash coins circulated in other countries while foreign cash coins also circulated in Japan.

The first Japanese cash coins were the Wadōkaichin (和同開珎) which were produced from 29 August 708. In 760 Japanese currency was reformed and gold and silver cash coins were introduced, however by the end of the 10th century the value of Japanese coinage had severely fallen combined with a weak central government led the Japanese to return to barter. From the 12th century onwards the Japanese started importing Chinese currency again even while the Southern Song dynasty banned the export of its coinage, while the import of Chinese cash coins surged again during the Ming dynasty era when large amounts of Ming Chinese cash coins were imported.

The Japanese started locally imitating Chinese cash coins, which were known as Shichūsen (私鋳銭). But the quality of these cash coins varied severely depending on the mint. As many cash coins circulated in the market for a long time their quality diminished over time becoming known as Bitasen (鐚銭, "bad metal money"). After the Tokugawa shogunate banned Bitasen in 1608 they started producing their own coinage and after 1859 provincial authorities were allowed to mint their own coinages. Japanese cash coins were officially demonetised in 1891 after officially circulating as a division of the Japanese yen with an exchange rate of 10.000 mon for 1 yen.

Fuhonsen 

The first Japanese embassy to China is recorded to have been sent in 630, following with Japan, who adopted numerous Chinese cultural practices. The importance of metallic currency appeared to Japanese nobles, probably leading to some coin minting at the end of the 7th century, such as the  coinage (富本銭), discovered in 1998 through archaeological research in the area of Nara. An entry of the Nihon Shoki dated April 15, 683 mentions: "From now on, copper coins should be used, but silver coins should not be used", which is thought to order the adoption of the Fuhonsen copper coins. The first official cash coinage was struck in 708.

Kōchōsen

Early Kōchōsen 

Japan's first formal currency system was the Kōchōsen (Japanese: 皇朝銭, "Imperial currency"). It was exemplified by the adoption of Japan's first official coin type, the Wadōkaichin. It was first minted in 708 CE on order of Empress Genmei, Japan's 43rd Imperial ruler. "Wadōkaichin" is the reading of the four characters printed on the coin, and is thought to be composed of the era name Wadō (和銅, "Japanese copper"), which could alternatively mean "happiness", and "Kaichin", thought to be related to "Currency".

Last Kōchōsen 

The Kōchōsen Japanese system of coinage became strongly debased, with its metallic content and value decreasing. By the middle of the 9th century, the value of a coin in rice had fallen to 1/150th of its value of the early 8th century. By the end of the 10th century, compounded with weaknesses in the political system, this led to the abandonment of the national currency, with the return to rice as a currency medium. The last official Japanese coin emission occurred in 958, with very low quality coins called Kengen Taihō (乾元大宝), which soon fell into disuse.

The last Kōchōsen coins produced after the Wadōkaichin was debased include:

Toraisen, Shichūsen, and Bitasen 

List of Toraisen, Shichūsen, and Bitasen cash coins:

Edo period

List of cash coins issued by the Tokugawa shogunate 

During the history of the Japanese mon under the Tokugawa shogunate, many different cash coins with different obverse inscriptions were cast, the main cash coins cast by the central government were:

List of Nagasaki trade coins 

The following coins were minted in the city of Nagasaki for export to other countries:

Nagasaki trade coins notably bear the inscription of many Song dynasty coins because those coins were already widespread in circulation on the Southeast Asian market making the Nagasaki trade coins more familiar for its target demographic.

List of local cash coins cast during the Bakumatsu 

Many Japanese domains produced their own currency which happened chaotically, so that the nation’s money supply expanded by 2.5 times between 1859 and 1869, leading to crumbling money values and soaring prices.

These coins were often produced with the name of the domain or province on them, the mon coins produced by domains are:

See also 

 List of Chinese cash coins by inscription

Notes

References

Sources 

 Early Japanese Coins. David Hartill. , Published: October 6, 2011.

Coins of Japan
Cash coins by inscription